Basin Transit, formally Morongo Basin Transit Authority (MBTA) is the transit agency that serves the Morongo Basin in San Bernardino County, California. It is a joint powers authority between Yucca Valley, Twentynine Palms, and San Bernardino County. In addition to service within the Morongo Basin, it connects the Morongo Basin to Palm Springs International Airport.

History
In 2015, MBTA faced unionization efforts by the coach operators. MBTA responded by such unionization efforts by employee outreach programs and adjusted pay to stave off unionization efforts.

MBTA used to operated Joshua Tree National Park's RoadRunner shuttle during fiscal years 2018 and 2019. Service was terminated due to low ridership.

In 2022, MBTA changed its name to Basin Transit.

Routes
 Route 1 Yucca Valley – Twentynine Palms
 Route 3A Twentynine Palms Marine Base
 Route 3B Twentynine Palms Neighborhood
 Route 7A North Yucca Valley
 Route 7B South Yucca Valley
 Route 12 Yucca Valley – Palm Springs
 Route 15 M.C.A.G.C.C – Palm Springs
 Route 21 Landers – Yucca Valley

References

External links 
 Basin Transit official website

Public transportation in Riverside County, California
Public transportation in San Bernardino County, California
Bus transportation in California
Transit agencies in California
Coachella Valley
Colorado Desert
Mojave Desert
Palm Springs, California
Twentynine Palms, California
Yucca Valley, California
Transit authorities with natural gas buses